William J. Lynch (birth unknown – death unknown), also listed as Billie Lynch, was a professional rugby league footballer who played in the 1900s and 1910s.

Playing career

International honours
Billy Lynch won a cap for England while at Wakefield Trinity in 1910 against Wales.

County honours
Billy Lynch won cap(s) for Yorkshire while at Wakefield Trinity.

Challenge Cup Final appearances
Billy Lynch played right-, i.e. number 3, in Wakefield Trinity's 17-0 victory over Hull F.C. in the 1909 Challenge Cup Final during the 1908–09 season at Headingley Rugby Stadium, Leeds on Tuesday 20 April 1909, in front of a crowd of 23,587. and played right- in the 0-6 defeat by Hull F.C. in the 1914 Challenge Cup Final during the 1913–14 season at Thrum Hall, Halifax, in front of a crowd of 19,000.

County Cup Final appearances
Billy Lynch played right-, i.e. number 3, in Wakefield Trinity's 8-2 victory over Huddersfield in the 1910 Yorkshire County Cup Final during the 1910–11 season at Headingley Rugby Stadium, Leeds on Saturday 3 December 1910.

Notable tour matches
Billy Lynch played right-, i.e. number 3, and scored the try in Wakefield Trinity's 5-5 draw with New Zealand in the tour match at Belle Vue, Wakefield on Wednesday 23 October 1907, and played  in the 20-13 victory over Australia in the 1908–09 Kangaroo tour of Great Britain match at Belle Vue, Wakefield on Saturday 19 December 1908.

Club career
Billy Lynch made his début for Wakefield Trinity during September 1907, he appears to have scored no drop-goals (or field-goals as they are currently known in Australasia), but prior to the 1974–75 season all goals, whether; conversions, penalties, or drop-goals, scored 2-points, consequently prior to this date drop-goals were often not explicitly documented, therefore '0' drop-goals may indicate drop-goals not recorded, rather than no drop-goals scored. In addition, prior to the 1949–50 season, the archaic field-goal was also still a valid means of scoring points.

Testimonial match
Billy Lynch's Testimonial match at Wakefield Trinity was joint testimonial for; Arthur Burton, Arthur Kenealy "Nealy" Crosland, William "Billy" Lynch, and Thomas "Tommy" Poynton, and took place against Yorkshire at Belle Vue, Wakefield on Wednesday 27 April 1922.

Outside of rugby league
Billy Lynch was the landlord of the Windmill Inn, Doncaster Road, Foulby, and on 22 March 1916 he arranged a rugby league match for the benefit of Leonard Hewitt (birth registered fourth ¼ 1883 in Hemsworth district - death registered first ¼ 1917 (aged 33) in Hemsworth district) who had been incapacitated while in training with His Majesty's forces. The teams were captained by Billy Batten, and Billy Lynch.

References

External links
Search for "Billy Lynch" at britishnewspaperarchive.co.uk
Search for "Billie Lynch" at britishnewspaperarchive.co.uk
Search for "Leonard Hewitt" at britishnewspaperarchive.co.uk

England national rugby league team players
English rugby league players
Place of birth missing
Place of death missing
Rugby league centres
Rugby league wingers
Wakefield Trinity players
Year of birth missing
Year of death missing
Yorkshire rugby league team players